Whispers from the Abyss is a 1984 role-playing game adventure for Call of Cthulhu published by Theatre of the Mind Enterprises.

Contents
Whispers from the Abyss consists of three scenarios: On the Wings of Madness by Chip Bickley, De Schip Zonder Schaduw by Ed Wimble, and Whispers from the Abyss by Tom Bailey.

Reception
William A. Barton reviewed Whispers from the Abyss in Space Gamer No. 71. Barton commented that "In all three scenarios, TOME shows its commitment to emphasizing background data - especially in De Schip Zonder Schaduw, which includes several lengthy sections of log entries from an actual book called Voyages to the East Indies."

References

Call of Cthulhu (role-playing game) adventures
Role-playing game supplements introduced in 1984